The 2022 Tulsa municipal elections were held on August 23, 2022. A top two runoff election was scheduled for November 8 if no candidate receives a majority vote. All nine city council seats and the city auditor are elected to two year terms. The filing period was June 13–15. Incumbent Mayor G.T. Bynum is not up for reelection until 2024. All nine city council seats will have contested elections. City Auditor Cathy Carter was re-elected without opposition.

Incumbent City Councilors Vanessa Hall-Harper, Jeannie Cue, Crista Patrick, Lori Decter Wright, Phil Lakin, and Jayme Fowler were reelected for another term. Laura Bellis won the open city council race in district four to succeed retiring City Councilor Kara Joy McKee. Incumbents Mykey Arthrelli and Connie Dodson lost to challengers Grant Miller and Christian Bengel respectively.

General election

District 1
Incumbent Councilwoman Vanessa Hall-Harper faced two challengers in the nonpartisan primary: David Harris and Francetta Mays. Hall-Harper won reelection with over 60% of the vote in the first round of the election.

Candidates
Winner
Vanessa Hall-Harper, incumbent City Councilor first elected in 2016
Eliminated in primary
David Harris, community engagement specialist, tech entrepreneur, and candidate for Tulsa Public Schools Board of Education district 3 in 2021
Francetta Mays, pastor and self-employed business consultant

Results

District 2
Incumbent Councilwoman Jeannie Cue defeated challenger Aaron Bisogno in the August election.

Candidates
Winner
Jeannie Cue, incumbent City Councilor first elected in 2012
Eliminated in primary
Aaron Bisogno , loan specialist and candidate for Tulsa City Council district 2 in 2014 and 2016

Endorsements

Results

District 3
Incumbent Councilwoman Crista Patrick defeated challenger Daniel Joseph Grove in the August election.

Candidates
Winner
Crista Patrick, incumbent City Councilor first elected in 2018
Eliminated in primary
Daniel Joseph Grove, roofing contractor

Endorsements

Results

District 4
Incumbent city councillor Kara Joy McKee retired and did not seeking reelection. Laura Bellis earned just over 50% of the vote, winning the August election outright.

Candidates
Winner
Laura Bellis, executive director of Take Control Initiative
Eliminated in primary
Michael Birkes, architect
Michael Feamster, president of Nabholz Construction's Southwest Region
Weydan Flax	
Matthew Fransein,  director of development and project manager at Tulsa Metropolitan Ministry
Bobby Dean Orcutt, co-owner of Mercury Lounge

Results

District 5

Candidates
Incumbent city councilor Mykey Arthrelli lost re-election Grant Miller. Upon his election Miller became the sole city councillor registered with the Libertarian Party of Oklahoma.

Winner
Grant Miller
Eliminated in runoff
Mykey Arthrelli, incumbent City Councilor first elected in 2020
Eliminated in primary
Latasha Jim, entrepreneur
Adil Khan, consultant
Ty Walker, candidate for Tulsa City Council district 5 in 2018, 2020 Tulsa mayoral election candidate, and small business owner

Results

District 6

Candidates
Winner
Christian Bengel, general election and runoff candidate for City Councilor district 6 in 2020
Eliminated in runoff
Connie Dodson, incumbent City Councilor first elected in 2014
Eliminated in primary
Lewana Harris, senior consultant for Korn Ferry

Results

District 7

Candidates
Winner
Lori Decter Wright, incumbent City Councilor first elected in 2018
Eliminated in runoff
Ken Reddick, candidate for Tulsa City Council district 7 in 2018 and 2020 Tulsa mayoral election candidate
Eliminated in primary
Jerry Griffin, member of the Tulsa Public Schools Board of Education representing district 6

Endorsements

Results

District 8
Incumbent Councilman Phil Lakin defeated challenger Scott Houston in the August election.

Candidates
Winner
Phil Lakin, incumbent City Councilor first elected in 2011
Eliminated in primary
Scott Houston, vice president of American Century Life Insurance Company

Endorsements

Results

District 9
Incumbent Councilman Jayme Fowler faced two challengers in the nonpartisan primary: Lee Ann Crosby and Chad Hotvedt. Fowler won reelection with over 50% of the vote in the first round of the election.

Candidates
Winner
Jayme Fowler, incumbent City Councilor first elected in 2020
Eliminated in primary
Lee Ann Crosby, candidate for Tulsa City Council district 9 in 2020
Chad Hotvedt, special education teacher

Results

City Auditor
Cathy Carter was re-elected without opposition to another two-year term. She was first elected in 2013 and has not faced an election opponent since.

Charter Questions
There are three proposed city charter amendments on the ballot in the August election. The Tulsa World endorsed all three of the proposed city charter amendments. All three amendments were approved by voters in the August 23 election.

Mayoral pay
This charter amendment involves the pay for the Mayor of Tulsa. A 1990 addition to the city charter refers to mayors pay as $70,000 when the mayor of Tulsa's salary is actually $105,000 in 2022. The amendment would remove the set dollar amount of $70,000 from the city charter. 

The plain language description of the amendment from the city describes the measure as:
"This Charter amendment is a housekeeping measure. In 2001, the Mayor’s salary was set by ordinance at $105,000, but our Charter has language dating back to 1990 that still refers to the first Mayor’s annual salary of $70,000. Because this old language has created confusion as to what the Mayor’s salary actually is, this amendment simply removes this outdated and conflicting reference to the first Mayor’s salary being $70,000. If this amendment is approved, it will not change the Mayor’s salary."

Candidate resident requirement
This charter amendment involves setting the residency requirement for running for city office to 365 days. In order to file for Mayor, city auditor, or city councillor the candidate must live in Tulsa or the city council district for 365 days prior to filing. Currently the residency requirement only requires the Mayor and city auditor live in the city, while city councillors must live in their district for 90 days before running for office. An exception is included in the amendment for candidates who's residency is interrupted by redistricting.

The plain language description of the amendment from the city describes the measure as:
"Currently our Charter provides that the Mayor and City Auditor must be Tulsa residents at the time they announce that they are running for office, but it does not require residency for any specific length of time. A candidate for City Council must be a resident in the district in which they are running for at least 90 days. This amendment would add a 365-day City of Tulsa residency requirement to run for Mayor or City Auditor and increase a Council candidates Council district residency requirement from 90 days to 365 days. This amendment also clarifies that, should a candidate’s Council district be changed when district boundaries are adjusted every 10 years due to a population shift, a candidate can still run for City Council in their new Council district."

City Auditor term length
This charter amendment involves increasing the city auditor's term length from 2 years to 4 years and staggering the elections with the 4-year mayoral terms. If passed, the 2026 city auditor election would be the first election using the new 4 year term.

The plain language description of the amendment from the city describes the measure as:
"The City Auditor is elected city-wide and currently serves a 2-year term of office, the same as City Councilors. The Mayor is the only other office holder elected city-wide and serves a 4-year term. This Charter amendment would change the City Auditor’s term in office to 4 years beginning in December 2026 and would stagger the Auditor’s term so that the Mayor’s and Auditor’s elections and terms are offset by 2 years"

External links
Tulsa World candidate coverage

References

2022 United States local elections
2022 Oklahoma elections